Aeromonas jandaei is a Gram-negative bacterium of the genus Aeromonas isolated from human feces in Oregon.

References

External links
Type strain of Aeromonas jandaei at BacDive -  the Bacterial Diversity Metadatabase

Aeromonadales
Bacteria described in 1992